Jacques Remiller (born April 13, 1941 in Condrieu) was a member of the National Assembly of France, representing Isère's 8th constituency from 2002 to 2012 as a member of the Union for a Popular Movement.

References

1941 births
Living people
People from Condrieu
Mayors of places in Auvergne-Rhône-Alpes
Union for French Democracy politicians
Union for a Popular Movement politicians
The Popular Right
Deputies of the 12th National Assembly of the French Fifth Republic
Deputies of the 13th National Assembly of the French Fifth Republic